Thryptomene dampieri is a species of flowering plant in the family Myrtaceae and is endemic to the north-west of Western Australia. It is a low, spreading shrub with prostrate stems, broadly egg-shaped leaves with the narrower end towards the base, and pinkish flowers with five petals and ten stamens.

Description
Flowering occurs from April to September.

Taxonomy
Thryptomene dampieri was first formally described in 2014 by Barbara Lynette Rye in the journal Nuytsia from specimens collected by John Green near Denham in 1957. The specific epithet (dampieri) honours William Dampier who collected this species near Shark Bay in 1699.

Distribution and habitat
This thryptomene grows in sand on dunes and limestone from near Exmouth to Hamelin Bay and on several off-shore islands.

Conservation status
Thryptomene dampieri is classified as "not threatened" by the Western Australian Government Department of Parks and Wildlife. The species occurs in a long stretch of the coast of Western Australia north of Shark Bay.

References

dampieri
Endemic flora of Western Australia
Rosids of Western Australia
Plants described in 2014
Taxa named by Barbara Lynette Rye